Miss Mamma Mia is a 2015 South Korean television series starring Kang Byul, Han Go-eun, Shim Hyung-tak and Seo Do-young. It aired on KBS Drama on Wednesdays to Thursdays at 23:00 for 12 episodes beginning January 28, 2015.

Plot
Seo Young-joo was abandoned by her parents as a child and betrayed by the man she loved. Despite all that, she stays positive as she raises her five-year-old daughter on her own while working part-time jobs.

Cast
 Kang Byul as Seo Young-joo
 Han Go-eun as Oh Joo-ri
 Shim Hyung-tak as Na Woo-jin/Kevin Edwards
 Seo Do-young as Yoo Myung-han
 Jang Young-nam as Lee Mi-ryun
 Kim Ha-eun as Kang Bong-sook
 Jang Eun-poong as Joo Ki-chan
 Ahn Seung-hoon as President Ahn
 Park Soo-young as Shim Seok-bong
 Shin Yi as Seo Ha-roo's biological mother	
 Gil Hae-yeon as Ma Hae-yeon
 Kim Ha-yoo as Seo Ha-ru
 Bae Kang-yoo as Lee Jong-min

References

External links
Miss Mamma Mia official KBSN website 

Korean Broadcasting System television dramas
2015 South Korean television series debuts
Korean-language television shows
2015 South Korean television series endings